Italia (minor planet designation: 477 Italia) (1901 GR) is a main-belt asteroid that was discovered on 23 August 1901 by Italian astronomer Luigi Carnera at Heidelberg.

Photometric observations of this asteroid collected in 2005 gave a provisional rotation period of 19.4189 hours and a brightness variation of about 0.2 in magnitude.

References

External links 
 
 

Background asteroids
Italia
Italia
T-type asteroids
S-type asteroids (Tholen)
S-type asteroids (SMASS)
19010823